The Miss Oregon's Outstanding Teen competition is the pageant that selects the representative for the U.S. state of Oregon in the Miss America's Outstanding Teen pageant.

The Miss Oregon's Outstanding Teen Pageant is held during Miss Oregon pageant week in Seaside, Oregon. The state pageant is normally held in late June or early July with the teen pageant taking place on Saturday night of pageant week.

Deja Fitzwater of Tigard was crowned Miss Oregon's Outstanding Teen on June 18, 2022 at the Seaside Civic & Convention Center in Seaside, Oregon. She competed for the title of Miss America's Outstanding Teen 2023 at the Hyatt Regency Dallas in Dallas, Texas on August 12, 2022.

Results summary 
The following is a visual summary of the past results of Miss Oregon's Outstanding Teen titleholders presented in the table below. The year in parentheses indicates year of the Miss America's Outstanding Teen competition in which the placement and/or award was garnered.

Awards

Preliminary awards 
 Preliminary Evening Wear/On-Stage Question: Emma Ellis (2017)

Non-finalist awards 
 Non-finalist Evening Wear/On-Stage Question: Emma Ellis (2017)
 Non-finalist Interview: Harley Emery (2014)

Winners

References

External links
 Official website

Oregon
Oregon culture
Women in Oregon
Annual events in Oregon